Pia Juul (30 May 196230 September 2020) was a Danish poet, prose writer, and translator. She received several prizes and was a member of the Danish Academy. She also taught at the writing school Forfatterskolen in Copenhagen.

Biography 
Juul was born in Korsør, Denmark, in 1962. Her parents were folk high school teachers Kurt Holger Juul and Inge Kærsgaard Hansen. She grew up in Skælskør before moving to the village Rørbæk in Himmerland at the age of six with her parents, her brother, and her younger sister. Juul graduated from Hobro Gymnasium in 1981 and enrolled in English studies at Aarhus University, but later dropped out. Her first collection of poems, levende og lukket, was published in 1985. Besides writing, she translated English, American, and Swedish literature for a living. She gave birth to a daughter in 1986. From 1989 to 1993, Juul was the co-editor of Danish literary magazine . She later served as a board member for Danske Skønlitterære Forfattere (Danish Fiction Writers) from 1993 to 1995 and was part of the Danish Arts Foundation's literary committee from 1996. Juul was awarded the Beatrice Prize by the Danish Academy in 2000, and became a member of the Academy herself in 2005. Following the global surveillance disclosures in 2013, Juul joined over a thousand writers worldwide including Umberto Eco and T. C. Boyle in signing an appeal to create an international convention on digital rights to prevent governments and corporations from abusing technology for surveillance purposes. She died in 2020 at the age of 58.

Bibliography 
levende og lukket, poems, 1985
i brand måske, poems, 1987
Forgjort, poems, 1989
Skaden, novel, 1990
En død mands nys, poems,1993
sagde jeg, siger jeg, poems, 1999
Mit forfærdelige ansigt, short stories, 2001
Gespenst & andre spil, drama, 2002
Opgang, short stories 2002
Jeg vil hellere dø, short stories 2003
Lidt ligesom mig, 2004
Dengang med hunden, short stories, 2005
Helt i skoven, poems, 2005
På jagt, children's book, 2005
Mordet på Halland, novel, 2009
Radioteateret, poems, 2010
Et liv med lys, biography, 2011
Af sted, til hvile, short stories episodes, 2012

References

External links
 

2020 deaths
Danish women poets
People from Korsør
1962 births
20th-century Danish poets
21st-century Danish poets
20th-century Danish women writers
21st-century Danish women writers
20th-century Danish short story writers
21st-century Danish short story writers
Danish women short story writers